George Hudson (1800–1871) was an English railway financier.

George Hudson may also refer to:

George Hudson (footballer) (born 1937), player for Coventry City F.C.
George Hudson (Canadian football) (born 1976), Canadian professional Canadian football player
George LeRoy Hudson (fl. 1913–1926), Canadian politician
George Hudson (entomologist) (1867–1946), New Zealand entomologist and astronomer
George Hudson (MP) (1845–1912), British Member of Parliament for Hitchin, 1892–1906
George Hudson (cricketer) (1905–1981), English cricketer
George R. Hudson (1919–2012), American politician